In philosophy, the problem of the creator of God is the controversy regarding the hypothetical cause responsible for the existence of God, on the assumption God exists. It contests the proposition that the universe cannot exist without a creator by asserting that the creator of the Universe must have the same restrictions. This, in turn, may lead to a problem of infinite regress wherein each new presumed creator of a creator is itself presumed to have its own creator. A common challenge to theistic propositions of a creator deity as a necessary first-cause explanation for the universe is the question: "Who created God?"

Some faith traditions have such an element as part of their doctrine. Jainism posits that the universe is eternal and has always existed. Isma'ilism rejects the idea of God as the first cause, due to the doctrine of God's incomparability and source of any existence including abstract objects.

Perspectives
Osho writes:

John Humphreys writes:

In The God Book, deist Michael Arnheim writes:

Alan Lurie writes:

Joseph Smith stated in the King Follett discourse:

Responses
Defenders of religion have countered that, by definition, God is the first cause, and thus that the question is improper:

Atheists counter that there is no reason to assume the universe was created. The question becomes irrelevant if the universe is presumed to have circular time instead of linear time, undergoing an infinite series of big bangs and big crunches on its own. However, this view itself raises questions such as why the universe would have such a structure, and whether those properties can be extended to apply to objects within it. It may be observed as well that if God is capable of time travel or exists in a time loop itself, it has no need of a separate creator, as it can travel to the origin of its existence and create itself, so that it will always have existed within the loop.

John Lennox, professor of Mathematics at Oxford writes:

Believers, for their part, sustained by the Neoplatonic and Aristotelian-Thomistic metaphysical tradition, are not affected by the possibility of this hypothetical scenario, since for them God, as Subsistent Being, would be the continuous (not punctual) reason for the existence of the ontologically contingent universe, independently of its temporal finitude.

See also
 Creator in Buddhism
 Demiurge
 Ex nihilo
 Intelligent design
 King Follett discourse
 Nothing comes from nothing
 Theotokos
 Turtles all the way down
 Ultimate Boeing 747 gambit
 Why there is anything at all

References

Arguments against the existence of God
Atheism
Metaphysics of religion
Philosophy of religion